Sultan Sir Jamshid bin Abdullah Al Said  (born 16 September 1929) is a Zanzibari royal who was the last reigning Sultan of Zanzibar before being deposed in the 1964 Zanzibar Revolution.

Biography

Jamshid ruled Zanzibar from 1 July 1963 to 12 January 1964. On 10 December 1963, the United Kingdom gave up its British protectorate over the already self-governing Zanzibar, leaving it as a constitutional monarchy within the Commonwealth under Jamshid, responsible for its own defense and foreign affairs. But this state of affairs was short-lived, as without British protection the Sultan was soon overthrown by Africans in the Zanzibar Revolution.

He fled into exile, firstly to Oman, but was not allowed to settle there permanently. He later moved to the United Kingdom, settling in Portsmouth with his wife and children. 

While his children and siblings were all able to settle in Oman in the 1980s, the Omani government continually denied Jamshid's requests to join them, citing security reasons. Their stance changed in September 2020, when after over 50 years in the United Kingdom, Jamshid's request to return to his ancestral land as a member of the Al-Said royal family only, but not as a titular Sultan, was granted by the government of the new Sultan of Oman, Haitham bin Tarik.

Honours

National
 Sovereign of the Order of the Brilliant Star of Zanzibar (Wisam al-Kawkab al-Durri al-Zanzibari) since 1 July 1963 (1st class on 30 March 1960). 
 Founder and Sovereign of the Most Illustrious Order of Independence of Zanzibar (Wissam al-Istiqlal) in five classes on 9 November 1963.

Foreign
Honorary Knight Grand Cross of the Order of St Michael and St George (GCMG) on 29 December 1963.
 Knight Grand Collar of the Royal Order of the Drum (Rwanda).

Ancestry

References

 

Al Said dynasty
1929 births
Living people
Dethroned monarchs
20th-century monarchs in Africa
Honorary Knights Grand Cross of the Order of St Michael and St George
Leaders ousted by a coup
Pretenders to the throne of Zanzibar
Sultans of Zanzibar
Zanzibari royalty
Zanzibari emigrants to Oman
20th-century Arabs
20th-century Omani people